Metalurh Stadium may refer to several stadiums in Ukraine:

 Metalurh Stadium (Kryvyi Rih)
 Metalurh Stadium (Donetsk)
 Metalurh Stadium (Kamianske)
 Metalurh Stadium, a stadium in Yenakieve
 Metalurh Stadium, a former name of Slavutych-Arena, Zaporizhia
 Metalurh Stadium, a former name of Elektrometalurh Stadium, Nikopol, Ukraine
 Metalurh Stadium, a former name of Dnipro Arena, Dnipro

Sports venues in Ukraine